Jett Michael Williams (born November 3, 2003) is an American professional baseball shortstop in the New York Mets organization.

Amateur career
Williams attended Rockwall-Heath High School in Heath, Texas where he played baseball. As a junior in 2021, he batted .347 with five home runs and 38 RBIs. During his senior season in 2022, he hit .411 with seven home runs, 41 RBIs, and ten doubles. He was named District 10-6A Offensive MVP and ended the season as a top prospect for the upcoming draft. The Dallas Morning News named him their Offensive Player of the Year. Williams originally committed to play college baseball at Texas A&M University, but switched to Mississippi State University.

Professional career
The New York Mets selected Williams in the first round with the 14th overall selection of the 2022 Major League Baseball draft. He signed with the team for $3.9 million.

Williams made his professional debut with the Rookie-level Florida Complex League Mets.

References

External links

2003 births
Living people
People from Heath, Texas
Baseball players from Texas
Baseball shortstops
Florida Complex League Mets players